Gabriel Donizette de Santana, or simply Gabriel (born September 8, 1987) is a Brazilianiel played for V in the J1 League during 2006 and 2007.

Club statistics

References

External links

1987 births
Living people
Brazilian footballers
Brazilian expatriate footballers
Mogi Mirim Esporte Clube players
Sanat Naft Abadan F.C. players
Aluminium Hormozgan F.C. players
Expatriate footballers in Iran
Expatriate footballers in Japan
J1 League players
J2 League players
Vissel Kobe players
Association football midfielders